Lincoln Public Library is a public library at 3 Bedford Road in Lincoln, Massachusetts. The library collection began in the late 1700s with a private subscription library started by Reverend Charles Stearns, and later a donation by Eliza Farrar of her husband, Professor John Farrar's library collection. In 1884  George Grosvenor Tarbell, a Boston businessman donated funds to construct the current Second Empire style building of reddish Longmeadow freestone, which was designed by the architect, William G. Preston. Large additions to the library were constructed in the 1950s and 1980s. The library is part of the Minuteman Library Network. It is a contributing property in the Lincoln Center Historic District.

References

External links
Official website

Public libraries in Massachusetts
Libraries in Middlesex County, Massachusetts